Typhina neocaledonica is a species of sea snail, a marine gastropod mollusk in the family Muricidae, the murex snails or rock snails.

Description

The length of the shell attains .

Distribution
This marine species occurs off New Caledonia.

References

 Houart, R, Buge, B. & Zuccon, D. (2021). A taxonomic update of the Typhinae (Gastropoda: Muricidae) with a review of New Caledonia species and the description of new species from New Caledonia, the South China Sea and Western Australia. Journal of Conchology. 44(2): 103–147.

External links
 Houart, R. (1987). Description of four new species of Muricidae (Mollusca: Gastropoda) from New Caledonia. VENUS (The Japanese Journals of Malacology). 46 (4): 202-210
 Houart, R. (2002). Description of a new typhine (Gastropoda: Muricidae) from New Caledonia with comments on some generic classifications within the subfamily. Venus. 61 (3-4): 147-159

Typhina
Gastropods described in 1987